Demak is a regency located in the Indonesian province of Central Java, on northern coast of the island. It is bordered by Jepara regency and the Java Sea to the north, Kudus and Grobogan regencies to the east, Grobogan and Semarang regencies to the south, while to the west are Semarang Regency and the city of Semarang, to which the districts of Mranggen and Sayung are essentially suburban. It was originally the centre of the Demak Sultanate, once a dominant power in the region. Due to its strong relation with the spread of Islam in Java and the Wali Sanga, it is sometimes referred to with the nickname Kota Wali.

History

Precolonial period

The area was a part of the Majapahit Empire during its zenith around the 14th century. The city itself was founded sometime in the late fifteenth century, possibly by a Chinese whose descendant later became the Sultans of Demak. The first Sultan was known as Raden Patah, who was a vassal of Majapahit until 1478. The city was founded as a seaport, next to the now-nonexistent Muria Palaeostrait separating Java from Muria Island (now Mount Muria), although silting has now entirely turned the waterway into land. The Sultanate expanded in the expense of the declining Majapahit and its fragments, conquering the coastal region of Tuban around 1527 and reaching inland areas as far as Malang by 1546. As the capital, the city became an important center for trade and the spread of Islam across the island, and a base of the semi-apocryphal Wali Sanga. Upon the decline of the Sultanate, the region was conquered in turn by the Pajang and Mataram Sultanates. The seaport began to silt sometime in the 17th century, diminishing the region's importance as a seaport.

Dutch East Indies Era

Direct VOC presence in Java started upon their capture of Jayakarta (now Jakarta, then Batavia) on 1619. In the 18th century, a massacre of ethnic Chinese in Batavia triggered a war between VOC and Mataram, resulting in the latter's defeat and cession of the north coast of Java, including Demak, to VOC. Upon the latter's dissolution on late 1799, administration of the area along with the rest of VOC's territory was transferred to the Dutch Government while Mataram was reduced to several fragmented states in the south coast of Java, including Yogyakarta and Surakarta.

As part of Dutch East Indies, Demak was organized with nearby Semarang into Residentie Semarang as the Demak Regency and later into Central Java province upon the independence of Indonesia.

Economy
In 2014, the gross regional domestic product of the regency was Rp 14.078 trillion (US$1.133 billion) or Rp 12.73 million per capita (US$1025), with the agriculture and manufacturing sectors being the largest contributors.

A  industrial park is currently under construction, aimed to boost investment in the regency.

Administrative districts
The Regency comprises fourteen districts (kecamatan), tabulated below with their areas and their populations at the 2010 Census and the 2020 Census. The table also includes the locations of the district administrative centres, the number of administrative villages (rural desa and urban kelurahan) in each district and its post code.

Note: (a) except for desa of Kembangan, which has a post code of 59511.

See also
Demak Sultanate
Demak (town)

References